Westia cyrtozona is a moth in the Psychidae family. It is found in the Philippines.

References

Natural History Museum Lepidoptera generic names catalog

Psychidae